Siriwat Chotiwecharak  (Thai ศิริวัฒน์ โชติเวชารักษ์, born 20 April 1989) is a professional footballer from Thailand.

References

1989 births
Living people
Siriwat Chotiwecharak
Siriwat Chotiwecharak
Siriwat Chotiwecharak
Siriwat Chotiwecharak
Siriwat Chotiwecharak
Siriwat Chotiwecharak
Siriwat Chotiwecharak
Association football defenders